Thuli Bheri is an urban municipality located in Dolpa District of Karnali Province of Nepal. The district headquarter of Dolpa lies in Dunai, which is a village in the south-east of Thuli Beri.

The municipality is divided into total 11 wards.

History
The municipality was established on 10 March 2017, when Government of Nepal restricted all old administrative structure and announced 744 local level units as per the new constitution of Nepal 2015.

Dunai, Majhphal, Juphal and Raha Village development committees were incorporated to form this new municipality. The headquarters of the municipality is situated at Dunai.

Demographics
At the time of the 2011 Nepal census, 96.7% of the population in Thuli Bheri Municipality spoke Nepali, 0.8% Bote, 0.6% Magar, 0.6% Sherpa, 0.2% Maithili, 0.2% Gurung, 0.1% Tamang and 0.1% Urdu as their first language; 0.7% spoke other languages.

In terms of ethnicity/caste, 67.4% were Chhetri, 11.0% Thakuri, 9.5% Kami, 2.6% Hill Brahmin, 2.4% Sarki, 2.2% Magar, 1.8% Damai/Dholi, 0.9% Tamang, 0.7% Gurung and 1.5% others.

In terms of religion, 97.4% were Hindu, 2.4% Buddhist, 0.2% Muslim and 0.1% Christian.

Transportation
Dolpa Airport lies Old-Juphal, in the north-west of the town and offers flights to Nepalgunj.

Education
In education, there is the Dolpa Campus affiliated with Tribhuvan University, one high school: Sarswoti Higher Secondary School affiliated with HSEB, and the Dunai Community Library which is a community learning center.

Healthcare
There is one hospital, the 15-bed Dolpa District Hospital.

References

External links
 http://www.thulibherimun.gov.np/
 https://www.citypopulation.de/php/nepal-mun-admin.php?adm2id=6207

Populated places in Dolpa District
Municipalities in Karnali Province
Nepal municipalities established in 2017